The factors that determine the values for alveolar pO2 and pCO2 are:
The pressure of outside air
The partial pressures of inspired oxygen and carbon dioxide
The rates of total body oxygen consumption and carbon dioxide production
The rates of alveolar ventilation and perfusion

Partial pressures
The partial pressures (in torr) for a human at rest:

Partial pressure of oxygen (at sea level)

The alveolar oxygen partial pressure is lower than the atmospheric O2 partial pressure for two reasons. 
 Firstly, as the air enters the lungs, it is humidified by the upper airway and thus the partial pressure of water vapour (47 mmHg) reduces the oxygen partial pressure to about 150 mmHg.
 The rest of the difference is due to the continual uptake of oxygen by the pulmonary capillaries, and the continual diffusion of CO2 out of the capillaries into the alveoli. 

The alveolar pO2 is not routinely measured but is calculated from blood gas measurements by the alveolar gas equation.

Partial pressure of carbon dioxide

Pathology
The partial pressure of carbon dioxide, along with the pH, can be used to differentiate between metabolic acidosis, metabolic alkalosis, respiratory acidosis, and respiratory alkalosis.

Hypoventilation exists when the ratio of carbon dioxide production to alveolar ventilation increases above normal values – greater than 45mmHg. If pH is also less than 7.35 this is respiratory acidosis.

Hyperventilation exists when the same ratio decreases – less than 35mmHg. If the pH is also greater than 7.45 this is respiratory alkalosis.

See also
 Alveolar-arterial gradient
 Diffusing capacity
 Pulmonary alveolus

References

Respiratory physiology